The North Sea Empire, also known as the Anglo-Scandinavian Empire, was the personal union of the kingdoms of England, Denmark and Norway for most of the period between 1013 and 1042 towards the end of the Viking Age. This ephemeral Norse-ruled empire was a thalassocracy, its components only connected by and dependent upon the sea.

The first king to unite all three kingdoms was Sweyn Forkbeard, king of Denmark since 986 and of Norway since 1000, when he conquered England in 1013. He died in the following year, and his realm was divided. His son Cnut the Great acquired England in 1016, Denmark in 1018 and Norway in 1028. He died in 1035 and his realm was again divided, but his successor in Denmark, Harthacnut, inherited England in 1040 and ruled it until his death in 1042. At the height of his power, when Cnut ruled all three kingdoms (1028–1035), he was the most powerful ruler in western Europe after the Holy Roman Emperor.

Name 
The term "North Sea Empire" was coined by historians at the beginning of the 20th century, although the conception of Canute's domains as having constituted an empire can be found as early as 1623, in John Speed's Histoire of Great Britaine. Historically, the union was referred to by its individual parts: the kingdoms of Denmark, Norway, and England.

Formation

England 

Cnut was the younger son of the Danish king Sweyn Forkbeard. When his father died on 3 February 1014 during an invasion of England, Cnut, who had been left in command of the fleet in the River Trent while Sweyn was in the south of England, was acclaimed by the Danes. However, the invasion fell apart: the men of the Kingdom of Lindsey, who had promised to supply horses for a tactical raid, were not ready before the English nobles had reinstalled King Æthelred (whom they had previously sent into exile), after forcing him to agree to govern less harshly.

Cnut's brother Harald became the King of Denmark, but with help from Eric Haakonsson of Norway, Cnut raised a new invasion fleet of his own and returned to England in the summer of 1015. The English were divided by intrigue among the king, his sons, and other nobles; within four months one of Æthelred's sons had pledged allegiance to Cnut and he controlled Wessex, the historic heart of the kingdom. Before the decisive battle for London could be fought, Æthelred died on 23 April 1016. The Londoners chose his son Edmund as their king, while most of the nobles met at Southampton and swore fealty to Cnut. Cnut blockaded London, but was forced to leave to replenish his supplies and was beaten by Edmund at the Battle of Otford; however, following the Danes as they raided into Essex, Edmund was in turn defeated at the Battle of Assandun. He and Cnut struck an agreement under which Edmund would retain Wessex and Cnut would rule all of England north of the River Thames. However, on 30 November 1016, Edmund in turn died, leaving Cnut as the King of England.

In the summer of 1017 he cemented his power by marrying Æthelred's widow, Emma, although he had previously married an English noblewoman, Ælfgifu of Northampton. In 1018 he paid off his fleet (with money especially from the citizens of London) and was fully recognised as King of England.

Denmark 

King Harald died childless in 1018 or 1019, leaving the country without a king. Cnut was his brother's heir and went to Denmark in 1019 to claim it. While there he sent his subjects in England a letter saying he was abroad to avert an unspecified "danger", and he only returned to quell incipient rebellions. One Danish chronicle states that the Danes had previously deposed Harald in favour of Cnut, then brought back Harald because of Cnut's frequent absences, until Cnut finally became king permanently after his brother's death.

King Olaf II of Norway and King Anund Jacob of Sweden, seeing the combined Anglo-Danish kingdom as a threat – Cnut's father Sweyn had asserted power over both their countries – took advantage of Cnut's being in England to attack Denmark in 1025 or 1026, and were joined by Ulf Jarl, Cnut's Danish regent, and his brother. Cnut took Olaf's fleet by surprise and took the battle to the Swedish fleet at the Battle of the Helgeå. The precise outcome is disputed, but Cnut came out best; Olaf fled and the threat to Denmark was dispelled.

In 1027, Cnut travelled to Rome, partly to expiate his sin for having Jarl Ulf killed the previous Christmas, partly to attend the coronation of Conrad II as Holy Roman Emperor and to demonstrate his importance as a ruler. He secured relaxation of tolls levied on pilgrims journeying to Rome from Northern Europe, and on Papal fees for English archbishops receiving their pallium; he also began a relationship with Conrad that led to the Emperor's son Henry marrying Cnut's daughter Gunnhild and before that to the Emperor ceding to Denmark Schleswig and a strip of ancient Danish territory between Hedeby and the Eider that the Germans had occupied as a buffer zone against the Danes.

Norway 

Olaf II had extended his power throughout Norway while Jarl Erik was with Cnut in England. Cnut's enmity with him extended further back: Æthelred had returned to England in a fleet provided by Olaf. In 1024 Cnut had offered to let Olaf govern Norway as his vassal; but after Helgeå, he set about undermining his unpopular rule with bribes, and in 1028 set out with 50 ships to subjugate Norway. A large contingent of Danish ships joined him, and Olaf withdrew into the Oslo Fjord while Cnut sailed along the coast, landing at various points and receiving oaths of allegiance from the local chieftains. Finally at Nidaros, now Trondheim, he was acclaimed king at the Eyrathing, and in a few months Olaf fled to Sweden.

In 1030, Olaf attempted to return, but the people of the Trondheim area did not want him back and he was defeated and killed at the Battle of Stiklestad.

Parts of Sweden 

After Helgeå, Cnut also claimed to rule "part of Sweden" together with England, Denmark, and Norway. He had coins minted either in the capital, Sigtuna, or in Lund, then part of Denmark, with the inscription CNVT REX SW ("Cnut King of the Swedes"). Western Geatland or Blekinge have been suggested. Most England runestones are in Uppland. It was probably either overlordship or disputed rule; Cnut did not have to be present in Sweden to order the minting of coins, coins were also minted asserting he ruled Ireland. Irish coinage and Swedish history at this early date is very uncertain.

Also, Anglo-Saxon sources state Anund Jakob won the Battle of Helgeå. If the Danes controlled Sweden they did only control Svealand for a maximum of 3 years before Anund ousted Cnut. In 1030 Anund is again in firm control according to sources of Sweden. Since Anund Jakob decided on bishops for all of Sweden 1030 in Adam of Bremens source. Adam does not mention a Danish conquest in his description of Anunds reign 1030. Rather Anund Jakob and Sweden militarily supported Olaf the second in his attempts to regain the Norwegian throne from Cnut 1030.

Tributary areas 

In addition to part of Sweden, of which he or the person who wrote the heading to his letter claimed he was king part of, Cnut received tribute from the Wends and was allied with the Poles; in 1022, together with Godwin and Ulf Jarl, he took a fleet east into the Baltic to confirm his overlordship of the coastal areas that the Danish kings dominated from Jomsborg.

Immediately after his return from Rome, Cnut led an army into Scotland and made vassals of Malcolm, the high king of Scotland, and two other kings, one of whom, Echmarcach mac Ragnaill, was a sea-king whose lands included Galloway and the Isle of Man and would become king of Dublin in 1036. All these and likely also the Welsh paid tribute, on the model of the Danegeld that Æthelred had instituted to pay off the Danes; and Cnut was thus reasserting the dominion over the Celtic kingdoms that recent English kings had had to let lapse, as well as punishing those who had supported Olaf against him. A verse by the Icelandic skald Óttarr svarti calls Cnut "king of the Danes, the Irish, the English and the Islanders"; presumably Norway is omitted because Cnut had not yet come to power there.

Religion 

By the early 11th century, England had been Christian for centuries; the Danelaw was in transition from paganism to Christianity, but the Scandinavian countries were still predominantly pagan. Cnut's father, Sweyn, had initially been pagan but in later life had been basically Christian. In England, Cnut assiduously promoted the interests of the Church, and this brought him acceptance from the Christian rulers of Europe that no other Scandinavian king had previously been accorded. In Norway, in contrast, he built churches and was both respectful and generous to the clergy, but also made allies of the heathen chieftains, and unlike Olaf, did not make laws benefitting the Church until his power was on a solid footing.

Governance 

Early in 1017, probably because he was king by right of conquest not more normal means, Cnut divided England into four earldoms on the Scandinavian model: Wessex he governed directly, and of his allies Thorkell the Tall became Earl of East Anglia, Eric Haakonsson retained Northumbria, which Cnut had already given him, and Eadric Streona became Earl of Mercia. But the last was disgraced and executed within a year. In 1018 Cnut revived at least two earldoms in Wessex and at a meeting at Oxford, his followers and representatives of the English agreed that he would govern under the laws of King Edgar.

Anglo-Saxon historian Frank Stenton points out that the Anglo-Saxon Chronicle has relatively little to say about Cnut's reign except to note his frequent travels abroad, indicating that he was in strong control of England. Thorkell likely acted as his regent during his absences, until they had a falling out and he was outlawed in 1021. The terms of their reconciliation in Denmark in 1023, with an exchange of sons for fosterage and Thorkell becoming Cnut's regent in Denmark, suggests that Thorkell had won them with an armed force.

However, it was left to another of Cnut's earls, Siward, to protect his earldom of Northumbria by consolidating English power in Scotland; at his death in 1055 he, not the king, was overlord of all the territory that the Kingdom of Strathclyde had annexed early the previous century.

The Danes had more reason to grumble about Cnut's absences than the English; he reigned primarily from England, leaving regents in charge in Denmark. He replaced Thorkell as his primary advisor in England with Godwin, an Englishman whom he made Earl of Wessex, while within three years of their reconciliation he had also been replaced as regent of Denmark, by Ulf Jarl, Cnut's sister's husband, whom Cnut also made guardian of his son by Emma, Harthacnut. Ulf in turn proved less than loyal, first conspiring against him with the kings of Sweden and Norway, then making a power play by having the nobles swear fealty to Harthacnut (thus effectively to him); Cnut returned to Denmark at Christmas 1026, ordered his housecarls to kill Ulf, and it was done in Trinity church at Roskilde. By the end of his life, he had entirely replaced the Scandinavian inner circle who advised him with Englishmen.

In Norway, Cnut stayed into the new year and then left Jarl Erik's son Hakon in charge as his regent (he had served Sweyn Forkbeard in the same capacity), but he drowned the following winter. As his replacement Cnut sent Swein, the younger of his two sons by Ælfgifu and thus known as Sveinn Alfífuson in Norway – along with his mother as guardian. They were delayed in southern Norway while Olaf's return was rebuffed, but became even more unpopular than he had been. Ælfgifu tried to impose new taxation and stricter controls on a people who valued their independence and especially resented that the new customs were Danish.

Cnut also prepared to hand over Denmark to one of his sons: upon taking power in Norway, he held a great court in Nidaros and proclaimed Harthacnut, his son by Emma, king of Denmark. As Stenton points out, by appointing different sons his heirs in different countries, he demonstrated that he did not have "the deliberate intention of founding a northern empire . . . [which] would remain united after his death." It may have been simply the custom of his people. In any event, it was clear throughout Cnut's reign that the weakness of his empire lay in the impossibility of finding loyal and competent regents to govern when he could not be present. And his sons could not hold it together.

After Cnut's death 
The North Sea Empire collapsed immediately once Cnut died in 1035. In Norway, it was already collapsing: by the winter of 1033, Swein and Ælfgifu were so unpopular that they were forced to leave Trondheim. In 1034, the leader of the army that had rebuffed and killed King Olaf at Stiklestad went together with one of the king's loyal followers to bring his young son Magnus back from Gardariki to rule, and in autumn 1035, a few weeks before Cnut's death, Swein and his mother had to flee the country altogether and go to Denmark. Swein died shortly afterwards.

In Denmark, Harthacnut was already ruling as king, but he was unable to leave for three years because of the threat that Magnus of Norway would invade to exact revenge. In the meantime the English nobles, divided between him and Cnut's younger son by Ælfgifu, Harold Harefoot, decided to compromise by having Harold rule as regent; by the end of 1037, Ælfgifu had persuaded the most important nobles to swear allegiance to Harold, who was firmly ensconced as Harold I – and Harthacnut's own mother, Queen Emma, had been forced to take refuge in Flanders.

Harthacnut prepared an invasion fleet to wrest England from his half-brother, but the latter died in 1040 before it could be used. Harthacnut then became king of England, reuniting it with Denmark, but made a generally bad impression as king. The Anglo-Saxon Chronicle said of him that he never did anything royal during his entire reign. He died suddenly in June 1042 "as he stood at his drink" at the wedding feast of Tovi the Proud, one of the Danish thegns of his father's court. At first glance Harthacnut's death seems to have brought about the end of the North Sea Empire. However, Magnus of Norway, utilising the agreement he had made with Harthacnut in 1040, took control of Denmark and had plans to invade England and reunite the kingdoms and Empire. In consolidating his power in Denmark he crushed a Wendish invasion at the battle of Lyrskov Hede initiated shortly after he had destroyed the Jomsviking heartlands. This may have been an effective own goal, as it destroyed one of the key political and military components of Sveyn Forkbeard and Cnut the Great's rise to dominence. While Magnus had ejected Sveyn of Sweden from Denmark in 1046, Adam of Bremen briefly notes that Sveyn and an Earl Tovi removed Magnus from Denmark in 1047. This is confirmed by the contemporary Anglo-Saxon Chronicle, which reports that in 1047 Sveyn asked England for 50 ships to help in the battle against Magnus. "And then Sveyn expelled Magnus from Denmark and entered the country by a huge carnage, and the Danes paid him a large sum of money and recognized him as king. And the same year Magnus died.'

See also 
 Kalmar Union
 List of English monarchs
 List of Danish monarchs
 List of Norwegian monarchs
 List of Swedish monarchs
 List of possessions of Norway
 Norse activity in the British Isles
 Viking expansion

Footnotes

References 

Cnut the Great
Scandinavian history
Former empires in Europe
Anglo-Norse England
1016 establishments in Europe
1035 disestablishments in Europe